The Tiburon Peninsula, or The Xaragua Peninsula,  simply "the Tiburon" (le Tiburon), is a region of Haiti encompassing most of Haiti's southern coast. 
It starts roughly at the southernmost point of the Haiti-Dominican Republic border and extends westward near Cuba, forming a large headland. Three of Haiti's ten departments are located entirely within the region. They are the departments of Grand'Anse, Nippes and Sud.

Etymology
The words Tiburon and Xaragua are linked to the Taino natives who were the region's first inhabitants. The region is often referred to as the Great South, le Grand-Sud (French), or Nansid (Haitian).

Administrative Division
The Tiburon is 1 of the 4 regions of Haiti, administrated through 4 departments and 1 arrondissement.
Half of Sud-Est is also located within the Tiburon Peninsula. A large part of Ouest department is also located in the region, with the capital, Port-au-Prince serving as the line of demarcation between central Haiti and the south. 

 Nippes Department
 Grand'Anse department
 Sud Department
 Sud-Est Department
 Léoganes Arrondissement

Geography
The region is the southern and westernmost point of Haiti. It is bordered by the Gulf of Gonave to the north and the Caribbean sea to the south making it the region with the longest coastline.

Geology
The region is crossed from west to east by the Enriquillo-Plantain-Garden fault line, one of the longest fault lines in the country and responsible for the 2010 Earthquake in Léoganne and the 2021 Earthquake in Cayes-Jérémi.

Mountain Ranges
Two main mountain ranges form the region, the Massif de la Hotte reaching its highest point in Pic Macaya, and the Massif de la Selle the highest point in the country in Pic La Selle.

Coastal Line
The region has the longest coastline in Haiti. Along the coast, multiple bays follow each other in series forming lush green plains and valleys.

Island
The Xaragua counts multiple islands, cays, and reefs, some inhabited seasonally by local fishermen.
 Isle-à-Vaches and its cays
 Les Cayemites and its cays
 The Flamands Islands
 The Baradères Peninsula and its cays
 La Navase
 Rochelois reefs

River
Multiple rivers flow from the mountains to the coast
 Monance
 Nippes
 Grand'Anse
 Voldrogue
 Ravine du Sud
 Cavaillon
 Bainet
 Jacmel

Hurricane
This region is often affected by hurricanes.

Demography
Due to its isolation and the large presence of mountains instead of plain, unlike the Marien and Artibonite. The population of this region has always been more diverse with a high concentration of white and mixed-race.

Economy

Agriculture
The Cayes region is the biggest plain in the region. Many farmers grow vetivè making Haiti the first producer of essential oils.
Jérémi is known for its production vivrière, making it the hub of roots-vegetables.

Fishing
Many families in the region fish for local consumption.

Tourism
Due to its coastline, Xaragua is reputated for some of the most beautiful beaches in the Caribbean. Lack of investment there are no resorts but a multitude of family own hotels that accommodate local and international tourists.

Forts
Like much of the country this region has a large collection of forts
 Marfranc
 Platons
 Ogé
 Oliviers
 Oranger

Mining
The town of Miragoanes has long been exploited by Reynold Co. for bauxite and aluminum.
Studies have shown the presence of iridium in the Jacmel area although no exploitation licenses have been issued.

References

Landforms of Haiti
Peninsulas of North America
Grand'Anse (department)
Nippes
Sud (department)
Sud-Est (department)